Gaius Petronius or Publius Petronius (c. 75 BC – after 20 BC) was the second and then fourth Prefect of Roman Aegyptus.

History

Petronius led a campaign into present-day central Sudan against the Kingdom of Kush at Meroë, whose queen Imanarenat had previously attacked Roman Egypt. Failing to acquire permanent gains, he razed the city of Napata to the ground and retreated to the north.

Indeed, Strabo describes a war with the Romans in the 1st century BC.  After the initial victories of Kandake (or "Candace") Amanirenas against Roman Egypt, the Kushites of northern Nubia were defeated and Napata sacked.  

Remarkably, the destruction of the capital of Napata was not a crippling blow to the Kushites and did not frighten Candace enough to prevent her from again engaging in combat with the Roman military. 

Indeed, it seems that Gaius Petronius' attack might have had a revitalizing influence on the kingdom. Just three years later, in 22 BC, a large Kushite force moved northward with intention of attacking Qasr Ibrim. Alerted to the advance, Petronius again marched south and managed to reach Qasr Ibrim and bolster its defences before the invading Kushites arrived.

Although the ancient sources give no description of the ensuing battle, we know that at some point the Kushites sent ambassadors to negotiate a peace settlement with Petronius and possibly accept a status like "Client State" of Rome. 

By the end of the second campaign after other years of fighting, however, Petronius was in no mood to deal further with the Kushites. The Kushites succeeded in negotiating a peace treaty on favourable terms and trade between the two nations increased.

See also
Roman Egypt
Napata
Kingdom of Kush

Notes

Bibliography
Edwards, David N. (2004). The Nubian Past. London: Routledge. pp. 348 Pages. .
Leclant, Jean (2004). The empire of Kush: Napata and Meroe. London: UNESCO. pp. 1912 Pages. .
Roger S. Bagnall. Publius Petronius, Augustan Prefect of Egypt. In: Naphtali Lewis (Hrsg.): Papyrology (Yale Classical Studies XXVIII) (1985). S. 85–93.

70s BC births
1st-century deaths
Year of birth uncertain
Year of death unknown
1st-century BC Romans
1st-century BC Roman governors of Egypt
Roman governors of Egypt
Petronii
1st century BC in Roman Egypt